Frank Junge (born 5 May 1967) is a German politician of the Social Democratic Party (SPD) who has been serving as a member of the Bundestag from the state of Mecklenburg-Vorpommern since 2013.

Political career
Junge joined the SPD in 1998. He first became a member of the Bundestag in the 2013 German federal election, representing the Ludwigslust-Parchim II – Nordwestmecklenburg II – Landkreis Rostock I district. 

In parliament, Junge served on the Committee on Tourism (since 2013), the Committee for Economic Affairs and Energy (2017–2021) and the Budget Committee (since 2021). On the Budget Committee, he is his parliamentary group’s rapporteur on the annual budget of the Federal Ministry for Economic Affairs and Climate Action.

In 2019, Junge was appointed by the Federal Ministry of the Interior, Building and Community to serve on the committee that oversaw the preparations for the 30th anniversary of German reunification.

References

External links
  
 Bundestag biography 
 

1967 births
living people
members of the Bundestag 2013–2017
members of the Bundestag 2017–2021
Members of the Bundestag 2021–2025
Members of the Bundestag for Mecklenburg-Western Pomerania
members of the Bundestag for the Social Democratic Party of Germany